Kerala Sangeetha Nataka Akademi is located in Thrissur city, of Kerala, in India. It was established on 26 April 1958, inaugurated by then Indian Prime Minister Pandit Jawaharlal Nehru. The academy started a cultural centre at the Bahrain Kerala Samajam in Bahrain on 1 October 2010.

The academy presents awards for various fields like music, dance, theatre and traditional art forms. Some of the major awards include: 
 Kerala Sangeetha Nataka Akademi Fellowship
 Kerala Sangeetha Nataka Akademi Award

See also
 KPAC
 Kalidasa Kalakendram

References

External links

Arts of Kerala
Arts organisations based in India
Performing arts in India
Organisations based in Thrissur
Music organisations based in India
1958 establishments in Kerala
Arts organizations established in 1958
Kerala Sangeetha Nataka Akademi